Audrey Erskine Lindop (26 December 1920, London – 7 November 1986, Isle of Wight) was an English writer of various forms of fiction, including crime, mainstream and historical. She was active from 1948 to 1970. She was married to the writer Dudley Leslie with whom she sometimes collaborated.

Her novel I Start Counting won the Grand Prix de Littérature Policière in 1967, and was made into a film starring Jenny Agutter. Other novels which have been filmed are I Thank a Fool and The Singer Not the Song.

Selected novels
 In Me My Enemy (1948)
 Soldiers' Daughters Never Cry (1948)
 The Tall Headlines (1950)
 The Singer Not the Song (1953) (AKA The Bandit and the Priest)
 Details of Jeremy Stretton (1955)
 The Outer Ring (1955) (AKA The Tormented)
 The Judas Figures (1956)
 Mist Over Talla (1957)
I Thank a Fool (1958)
 Nicola (1959)
The Way to the Lantern (1961)
I Start Counting (1966)
The Adventures of the Wuffle (1968) (Written with William Stobbs)
Sight Unseen (1969)
Journey Into Stone (1972)
Out of the Whirlwind (1972)
The Self-Appointed Saint (1975)

Short Stories 

 As One Lady to Another (1954), published in the London Evening News
 Heirs Unapparent (1954), published in the London Evening News

Filmography 
 Blanche Fury (1948) - screenwriter
 Tall Headlines (1952) - screenwriter, story by
 The Rough and the Smooth (1959) - screenwriter
 The Singer Not the Song (1961) - story by 
 I Thank a Fool (1962) - story by
 I Start Counting (1970) - story by
 Danger on Dartmoor (1980) - screenwriter, story by

Prizes and Awards 

 Grand Prize of Crime Fiction for the thriller Dash Through The Bill

References

External links 

English crime fiction writers
1920 births
1986 deaths
Writers from London
20th-century English novelists
English women novelists
20th-century English women writers
People from the Isle of Wight